The Brazilian Scottish Highland Games is an annual Highland Games event held in Rio Grande do Sul, Brazil.

Consist of a series of traditional Scottish competitions.

History

Events
Traditional competitions:
 Death Star
 Caber toss
 Stone put
 Hammer throw
 Tug of war

List of Games

See also
Highland games

References

External links
The Scottish Highland Games Association

Highland games
Scottish Brazilian
Tourist attractions in Rio Grande do Sul
Multi-sport events in Brazil
Sports festivals in Brazil